Czarnowo  is a village in the administrative district of Gmina Pomiechówek, within Nowy Dwór County, Masovian Voivodeship, in east-central Poland. The village is on the north bank of the Narew River, a short distance east of the point where the Wkra River flows into it from the north.

History 

The Battle of Czarnowo was fought on 23–24 December 1806 during the War of the Fourth Coalition, part of the Napoleonic Wars. French soldiers under the command of Marshal Louis-Nicolas Davout forced a crossing of the Wkra near Pomiechowo. When they advanced eastward to Czarnowo they were fiercely resisted by Russian troops led by Lieutenant General Alexander Ivanovich Ostermann-Tolstoy in an all-night contest. In the early morning hours of the 24th, Ostermann-Tolstoy ordered a retreat. The fighting caused about 1,400 casualties on each side.

Notes

References
 Chandler, David. The Campaigns of Napoleon. New York: Macmillan, 1966.
 Petre, F. Loraine. Napoleon's Campaign in Poland 1806-1807. London: Lionel Leventhal Ltd., 1976 (1907).

Villages in Nowy Dwór Mazowiecki County